The Gerace is an Italian river in whose source is near the source of the Petrace river in the Aspromonte National Park. From there, the river flows southeast past Gerace and into the Ionian Sea near Locri.

References

Drainage basins of the Ionian Sea
Rivers of the Province of Reggio Calabria
Rivers of Italy